Brodahl  is a surname. Notable people with this surname include:

Caroline Brodahl
Cris Brodahl
 Sverre Brodahl (1909–1998) was a Norwegian Nordic skier.
 Trygve Brodahl (1905–1996) was a Norwegian cross country skier.

See also

Bredahl
Bredal
Brodal